Tegart is a surname. Notable people with the surname include:

SIr Charles Tegart (1881–1946), colonial police officer in India and Mandatory Palestine
Tegart fort, style of militarized police fort constructed throughout Palestine during the British Mandatory period
Tegart's wall, barbed wire fence erected in 1938 by British Mandatory authorities on the northern border of Palestine
Greg Tegart (born 1929), Australian academic, scientist and former senior public servant
Jackie Tegart (born 1955/6), Canadian politician
Judy Tegart (born 1937), Australian professional tennis player